Ricigliano is a town and comune in the province of Salerno in the Campania region of south-western Italy.

Geography
The municipality borders with Balvano (PZ), Muro Lucano (PZ), Romagnano al Monte and San Gregorio Magno.

References

External links

Cities and towns in Campania
Localities of Cilento